"Tao" is Do As Infinity's twentieth single, released on July 27, 2005. The lyrics describe the parting of two friends. "Tao" was used as the Japanese opening song of Tales of Legendia. This was the last single released before the band disbanded in September 2005, but Do As Infinity reformed three years later, and released their twenty-first single, "∞1", in June 2009.

The title of the B-side, "Aurora", means 'dawn' in Italian; the lyrics of the song are like the conclusion of the story in "Break of Dawn", the first track on the band's first album Break of Dawn.

Song history
According to the Do the A-side booklet, "Tao" was originally to be included on their final album, Need Your Love, but was not because Nagao felt that it did not fit the album's theme. It was recorded two years before its actual release. Reportedly, Tomiko Van cried many times before the song was completely recorded.

Track listing
"Tao"
"Aurora"
"Tao" (Instrumental)
"Aurora" (Instrumental)

Promotional video
The promotional video for "Tao" was filmed in Hokkaidō, the scene of Van riding on her Harley Davidson was shot next to a potato farm according to the Do The A-side booklet. Van is seen lipping the words  (good-bye in Japanese) and waving good-bye after the main video ends.

Chart positions

References

External links
 "Tao" at Avex Network
 "Tao" at Oricon

2005 singles
Do As Infinity songs
Songs written by Dai Nagao
Tales (video game series) music
Song recordings produced by Seiji Kameda
2005 songs
Avex Trax singles